Kolaiyuthir Kaalam is a 2019 Indian Tamil-language thriller slasher film directed by Chakri Toleti and produced by V. Mathiyalagan. A remake of an English-language movie Hush, where a deaf and mute girl must fight for her life when a killer appears at her door. It stars Nayanthara, Bhumika Chawla, Pratap K. Pothen, Rohini Hattangadi and began production in November 2016. The film was released on 9 August 2019. The film was considered as a disaster movie at the box office. The film was remade again by Toleti in Hindi as Khamoshi (2019), which released before this film after it was delayed.

Plot
Shruthi (Nayanthara) is a deaf and mute girl who grew up in an orphanage in Chennai. However, impressed with Shruthi's character and natural talent, a millionaire from the UK adopts her and also declares her as the legal heir. When Shruthi reaches London, after the death of her adopted mother, trouble arises in the form of a home invasion. A strange man chases Shruthi inside the bungalow after killing all of the workers, along with Mr. Anand, and also sets the will on fire. After a lot of chasing Shruthi attempts to kill the man but before he could, Mrs. Anand steps in and shoots him. It is revealed that Mrs. Anand set it up in order to take all the assets for herself, but as Shruthi refuses Mrs. Anand shoots Shruthi in the shoulder. The masked man wakes up and kills Mrs. Anand. The movie pans out to the next day and the police show up, with Shruthi waiting. In the end the paramedics take her into the ambulance, and the masked man missing. When getting medical attention in the ambulance, the paramedic has a skull tattoo and Shruthi seems distraught. The movie ends without showing if Shruthi dies or the true identity of the masked man.

Cast 
Nayanthara as Shruthi Lawson
Bhumika Chawla as Mrs. Sawant
Pratap K. Pothen as Business Manager
Rohini Hattangadi as Cook
K. S. G. Venkatesh as Caretaker
Prem Kathir as Mr. Sawant
Julian Freund as James
Jo Ellis as Darla
Richard Banks as Paramedic
Ruthvi as Abha Lawson

Production 
In mid-November 2016, Chakri Toleti began working on his fourth feature film, following the bilingual Unnaipol Oruvan (2009) and Billa 2 (2012). Nayanthara was selected to play the leading role, and it was revealed that the film would be a heroine-centric project. A first look poster was subsequently released on 18 November 2016, coinciding with Nayanthara's birthday, with it being revealed that the film would mark the first production of venture of musician Yuvan Shankar Raja and the first Tamil film production for Pooja Entertainments' Vashu Bhagnani and Deepshikha Deshmukh. Later, Yuvan Shankar Raja and the other producers opted out of the project. V. Mathiyalagan of Etcetera Entertainment took over the production of the film. Tamannaah Bhatia is reprising Nayanthara's role in Hindi remake titled Khamoshi, which released on June 14, 2019.

Release 
The film was scheduled to release in India on 14 June 2019, but was delayed because the film shares its name with a novel by Sujatha, which director Balaji K. Kumar paid  for the novel's rights. The plea for the film is held on June 21. The film then went through multiple release date changes, eventually releasing on 9 August.

References

External links 
 

2010s Tamil-language films
2010s slasher films
Indian slasher films
Tamil-language psychological thriller films
2019 films
Indian remakes of American films
Tamil films remade in other languages
Films scored by Achu Rajamani
Indian mystery thriller films
Indian horror film remakes
Films about deaf people
Films directed by Chakri Toleti
2010s mystery thriller films
2019 psychological thriller films